The canton of Châteauneuf-sur-Loire is an administrative division of the Loiret department, central France. Its borders were modified at the French canton reorganisation which came into effect in March 2015. Its seat is in Châteauneuf-sur-Loire.

It consists of the following communes:
 
Bouzy-la-Forêt
Châteauneuf-sur-Loire
Combreux
Darvoy
Donnery
Fay-aux-Loges
Ingrannes
Jargeau
Saint-Denis-de-l'Hôtel
Saint-Martin-d'Abbat
Seichebrières
Sully-la-Chapelle
Sury-aux-Bois
Vitry-aux-Loges

References

Cantons of Loiret